The following lists events that happened during the 1700s in South Africa.

Events

1700
 An ordinance is proclaimed by the Cape Colony’s administration, restricting the importation of Asian slaves

1702
 3 April—The Merenstejin, a Dutch merchant ship, sinks off Jutten Island on the west coast of the Cape Colony

1706
 28 February—Adam Tas, a community leader in the Cape Colony, is jailed for drafting a petition accusing local VOC officials of corruption and money laundering

1707
 17 January—Rev. E.F. Le Bourg, a parson of whom Batavia was glad to be rid, arrives in Cape Town. He enters politics and stirs up trouble
 3 June—Johan Cornelis d'Ableing is appointed acting Governor of the Cape Colony

1708
 17 January—The Cape Council of Policy resolves to deport Rev. E.F. Le Bourg
 1 February—Louis van Assenburgh is appointed Governor of the Cape

Births
 1700—Hendrik Swellengrebel, later governor of the Dutch Cape Colony, is born in Cape Town on 20 September

References
See Years in South Africa for list of References

History of South Africa